Bernardo Rocha de Rezende (born 25 August 1959), known as Bernardo Rezende and nicknamed Bernardinho, is a Brazilian volleyball coach and former player. He is the current coach of the female volleyball team Rio de Janeiro Vôlei Clube. Rezende is the most successful coach in the history of volleyball, accumulating more than 30 major titles in twenty-year career directing the Brazilian male and female teams.

He has won two Olympic gold medals during his coaching career, as head coach of Brazil men's national volleyball team at Athens 2004 and Rio 2016 Olympics. He also won two bronze medals as head coach of Brazil women's national volleyball team at 1996 Atlanta and 2000 Sydney. As of 2021, with 48 medals overall, he is the most successful team sport coach of all time.

Career

Player
Rezende played volleyball from 1979 to 1985, and competed in two Olympics, winning a silver medal at the 1984 Summer Olympics. He also finished fifth at the 1980 Summer Olympics and won a gold medal at the 1983 Pan American Games. Rezende played in Fluminense, Volley Atlantica Boavista, Flamengo and Vasco da Gama from 1972 to 1988. With Atlântica Boavista he was the winner of Brazil Super League in 1981.

Coach
In 1988, he stopped playing to work started his coaching career as an assistant to Bebeto de Freitas at the 1988 Summer Olympics. In 1990 he became the coach of Italian female team Perugia, and remained there for two years. In 1990 he became coach of Brazil female team That year. Rezende with Brazil team placed second in the FIVB World Championship and won the FIVB World Grand Prix.

In 1996, the team won the bronze medal at the Atlanta Olympic Games and the gold medal at the FIVB World Grand Prix. In 1998 Rezende led the Brazilians to a South American title, earned qualification for the FIVB World Championship and won bronze in the FIVB World Grand Championship Cup in Japan.
In 1999, Bernardinho won the gold medal at the Pan American Games in Winnipeg, a silver medal in the FIVB World Grand Prix, gold in the South American Championship for the third time, and bronze at the FIVB World Cup. In 2000, he led Brazil to third place in the FIVB World Grand Prix and at the Olympic Games in Sydney 2000. two gold medalist in Montreux Volley Masters he was another achievement. Rezend leaving in 2000 female team. Since 2001, Bernardinho has been the coach of the Brazil male national team, with whom he won two Olympic titles in 2004 and 2016. After this success Rezende accepted the challenge of leading the Brazilian Men in 2001. The choice could not have been better. Bernardinho led the team to memorable victories including first place in the 2001 and 2003 editions of the FIVB World League and the gold medal at the 2002 FIVB World Championship.
In 2003, Bernardinho's star shone even stronger. He guided the team to titles in the FIVB World League and the FIVB World Cup, and bronze at the Pan American Games in Dominican Republic.
In July 2004, Brazil claimed their fourth FIVB World League title. In August, the team won its second Olympic gold medal in Athens and make new historic team. Bernardinho returned at the end of the year to the Superliga to coach Rexona-Ades.
In 2005, still coaching the Brazilian men team, he earned another four international medals, gold in the FIVB World League, gold at the South American Championship and gold at the FIVB World Grand Champions Cup in Japan. He also won silver at the America's Cup.
In 2006, Bernardinho won the FIVB World League, for the fifth time, and the FIVB World Championship for the second time.
The success didn't let up in 2007, with victories in the FIVB World League, the FIVB World Cup, the Pan American Games and the South American Championship. He also led a young team to second place at the America's Cup.
In 2008, Brazil failed in the most important tournaments of the season, finishing second in Beijing Olympic Games and fourth in the FIVB World League, which Final Round was played in Rio de Janeiro.
In 2009, however, the coach commanded a renewed team that won the FIVB World League, the FIVB World Grand Championship Cup and the South American Championship.
In 2010, Brazil started the season winning the ninth title of the FIVB World League, overcoming the Italian record. In the end of the year, Bernardo his third FIVB World Championship title with Brazil.

In 2011, Rezende led the Brazilian national team winning the silver medal in the FIVB World League, title and the South American Championship. In the end of the year, Brazil assured its spot at the London Olympic Games by finishing third in the FIVB World Cup.
In 2012 Rezende Once again climbed to the Olympic Games final and won silver medal. 2013 to 2015 won silver medal 2013 FIVB World League and 2014 FIVB World League, gold medal 2013 FIVB World Grand Championship Cup, gold medal 2013 South American Championship and 2015 South American Championship and reach the final 2014 FIVB World Championship front side Poland won silver medal. Start 2016 with a silver medal in 2016 FIVB World League. Continuation year and attend in Olympic Games. Rezende for the fourth time accede in final and winning match final against Italy and won gold medal Rio 2016.

Individual awards
 2008 - Brazilian Superliga - Best Coach
 2011 - Brazilian Superliga - Best Coach
 2011 - ESPN - Best Coach in Volleyball
 2012 - Volleyball Globe - Best Coach

Personal
Since 1999, Rezende was married to volleyball player Fernanda Venturini, with whom he has two daughters. They got divorced in 2020. From his previous marriage to player Vera Mossa he had a son who is currently the setter and captain of the Brazilian volleyball team, Bruno Rezende (Bruninho).

Management
Rezende besides lecturer is also a businessman on several fronts separate business and is part of the board of directors of all of them:
 Delirio Tropical - Restaurant founded in 1983 with 9 units in Rio de Janeiro.
 Bodytech Group - The largest fitness centers in Latin America, with 50 units and more than 87,000 students.
 Instituto Compartilhar - NGO created by Rezende with the mission to develop young people from disadvantaged communities through by sport.
  - Online educational institution.

References

External links

 
 
 
 Olympics 2016 Rezende - Reuters
 Volleyballadvisors - Bernardo Rezende
 Rezende in EcuRed 2012
 Espn.uol World Volleyball Rezende
 Melhordovolei Bernardo Rezende

1959 births
Living people
Volleyball players from Rio de Janeiro (city)
Brazilian men's volleyball players
Olympic volleyball players of Brazil
Volleyball players at the 1980 Summer Olympics
Volleyball players at the 1984 Summer Olympics
Medalists at the 1984 Summer Olympics
Olympic silver medalists for Brazil
Brazilian volleyball coaches
Olympic medalists in volleyball
Medalists at the 2016 Summer Olympics
Brazilian expatriates in Italy
Pan American Games medalists in volleyball
Pan American Games gold medalists for Brazil
Volleyball players at the 1983 Pan American Games
Medalists at the 2003 Pan American Games
Medalists at the 2007 Pan American Games